House of Aragon may refer to:

the branch of the Jiménez dynasty that ruled Aragon as kings between 1035 and 1162
the House of Barcelona, which ruled Aragon between 1137 and 1410, united Aragon and Catalonia and ruled Sicily from 1282 until 1409
the branch of the House of Trastámara that ruled Aragon and Sicily between 1412 and 1555 and Naples between 1442 and 1555

See also
Crown of Aragon
House of Habsburg (ruled Aragon 1516–1700)
House of Bourbon (ruled Aragon 1700–1715)